The Ferrée river is a tributary on the east bank of the Montmorency River. It flows in the municipalities of L'Ange-Gardien and Boischatel, in the La Côte-de-Beaupré Regional County Municipality, in the administrative region of Capitale-Nationale, in the province of Quebec, in Canada.

The upper part of this valley is served by Chemin des Sucreries, by Chemin du Nord-de-la-Ligne Hydro and by a few forest roads. Forestry, in particular the exploitation of sugar factories, constitutes the main economic activity in this valley; second, recreational tourism. While the lower part crosses the northern sector of the urban part of Boischatel.

The surface of the Ferrée river is generally frozen from the beginning of December until the end of March; however, safe traffic on the ice is generally from mid-December to mid-March. The water level of the river varies with the seasons and the precipitation; the spring flood occurs in March or April.

Geography 
The Ferrée river originates from a forest stream. This source is located in the heart of a mountain with three peaks (379 m, 385 m and 398 m) in the municipality of L'Ange-Gardien, at:
  north-east of the Montmorency River;
  north-west of the confluence of the Ferrée river and the Montmorency River;
  north-west of the north-west bank of the St. Lawrence River.

Upper part of the Ferrée river (segment of )

  north in L'Ange-Gardien, in a deep valley, to a bend in the river, corresponding to two streams, one of which comes from the southwest and the other North;
  in forest territory to the east in a deep valley up to a bend in the river, then south-east, to the confluence of the Rivière la Retenue ( coming from the northeast);

Lower part of the Ferrée river (segment of )

  to the south in a plain in forest territory by first forming a loop to the east, collecting a stream (coming from the west), crossing the Chemin du Pont- à-Mathias, successively forming a loop towards the east and another towards the west, up to a stream (coming from the northwest);
  to the south by forming two loops to the east, up to the Boischatel limit corresponding to a stream (coming from the west);
  in Boischatel, first towards the south in the forest zone by forming a loop straddling the inter-municipal limit between L'Ange-Gardien and Boischatel, and bypassing the northern part on the East side from the urban area of Boischatel, then south-west across a small artificial lake, to the dam at its mouth;
  to the southwest by crossing rue des Rochers, then forming three loops to the southeast by crossing the Royal Québec golf course to the bridge on rue Notre-Dame ;
  west in a small S, to its mouth.

The Ferrée river flows on the northeast bank of the Montmorency river, opposite the hamlet "Les Roches-Plates" located on the southwest bank.

From the confluence of the Ferrée river, the current flows over  generally towards the southeast by the course of the Montmorency River, up to the northwest bank of the St. Lawrence River.

These losses feed the Boischatel cave. During major floods, the section between the losses of the Ferrée River and the Montmorency river can flow in the open air.

Toponymy 
This river was formerly designated "Rivière Laval" and "Rivière Ferry".

The toponym "Rivière Ferrée" was formalized on August 14, 1997 at the Commission de toponymie du Québec.

Notes and references

Appendices

Related articles 
 Boischatel Cave
 La Côte-de-Beaupré Regional County Municipality
 L'Ange-Gardien, Quebec, a municipality
 Boischatel, a municipality
 Rivière la Retenue
 Montmorency River
 List of rivers of Quebec

Bibliography 
 

Rivers of Capitale-Nationale
La Côte-de-Beaupré Regional County Municipality